Achnacarnin is a village on the headland of Point of Stoer in Lairg, Sutherland, within the Scottish local authority area of the Highland Council.

References 

Populated places in Sutherland